The men's sprint competition at the 2014 Asian Games was held from 22 to 24 September at the Incheon International Velodrome.

Schedule
All times are Korea Standard Time (UTC+09:00)

Records

Results
Legend
DNS — Did not start
REL — Relegated

Qualifying

1/16 finals

Heat 1

Heat 2

Heat 3

Heat 4

Heat 5

Heat 6

Heat 7

Heat 8

Heat 9

1/16 final repechages

Heat 1

Heat 2

Heat 3

1/8 finals

Heat 1

Heat 2

Heat 3

Heat 4

Heat 5

Heat 6

1/8 final repechages

Heat 1

Heat 2

Race for 9th–12th places

Quarterfinals

Heat 1

Heat 2

Heat 3

Heat 4

Race for 5th–8th places

Semifinals

Heat 1

Heat 2

Finals

Bronze

Gold

Final standing

References 
Results

External links 
 

Track Men sprint